SS Samselbu was a Liberty ship built in the United States during World War II. She was transferred to the British Ministry of War Transportation (MoWT) upon completion.

Construction
Samselbu was laid down on 1 March 1944, under a Maritime Commission (MARCOM) contract, MC hull 2354, by J.A. Jones Construction, Brunswick, Georgia; sponsored by Mrs. William H. Barnhardt, and launched on 16 April 1944.

History
She was allocated to Runciman Shipping, on 26 April 1944.

References

Bibliography

 
 
 
 
 

 

Liberty ships
Ships built in Brunswick, Georgia
1944 ships
Ships sunk by mines
Liberty ships transferred to the British Ministry of War Transport
Maritime incidents in March 1945